G.Marimuthu is an Indian film director and actor, who has worked in the Tamil film industry. After making his debut as a director with Kannum Kannum (2008), he has gone on to make other ventures including Pulivaal (2014) and feature in supporting roles as an actor.

Career
In 1990, G. Marimuthu ran away from his home in the village of Pasumalaitheri in Theni and headed to Chennai wanting to be a film director. After initially working as a waiter in hotels, he became acquainted with lyricist Vairamuthu through their interests for literature, before managed to become an assistant director with Rajkiran for his films Aranmanai Kili (1993) and Ellame En Rasathan (1995). Marimuthu then continued work as an assistant director with film makers including Mani Ratnam, Vasanth, Seeman and S. J. Surya, before working as a co-director in Silambarasan's team, Manmadhan (2004). G. Marimuthu made his directorial debut with Kannum Kannum (2008), a romantic film starring Prasanna and Udhayathara. The film did not perform well at the box office but won critical acclaim. Behindwoods.com wrote "G. Marimuthu, debuting with story, screenplay, dialogue and direction has provided us with one of the cleanest, most honest and endearing love stories of recent times". Likewise, Sify.com noted "Marimuthu is a welcome addition to the brave new directors in Tamil cinema, who are trying their best within the commercial format to give a different type of love story". Marimuthu then also made Pulivaal (2014), developing the film's story from the Malayalam film Chaappa Kurishu (2011).

In the 2010s, he prioritised his acting career and featured in supporting roles in Tamil films. Mysskin introduced him as an actor in Yuddham Sei (2011), where he played a corrupt police officer. The success of the film prompted him to star in films including Aarohanam (2012), Nimirndhu Nil (2014) and Komban (2015), often featuring as police officer. His performance in Marudhu (2016) prompted Vishal to sign him on to feature in Kaththi Sandai (2016).

Filmography

Director

Actor 

Vaali (1999)
Udhaya (2004)
Kannum Kannum (2008)
Yuddham Sei (2011)
Aarohanam (2012)
Son épouse (2014; French)
Nimirndhu Nil (2014)
Jeeva (2014)
Komban (2015)
Trisha Illana Nayanthara (2015)
Kirumi (2015)
Uppu Karuvaadu (2015)
Pugazh (2016)
Mapla Singam (2016)
Marudhu (2016)
Thirunaal (2016)
Kuttrame Thandanai (2016)
Pagiri (2016)
Kodi (2016)
Veera Sivaji (2016)
Bairavaa (2017)
Enakku Vaaitha Adimaigal (2017)
Yaman (2017)
Yaakkai (2017)
Nagarvalam (2017)
Rubaai (2017)
Kootathil Oruthan (2017)
Magalir Mattum (2017)
Ippadai Vellum (2017)
Madura Veeran (2018)
Kadaikutty Singam (2018)
Kattu Paya Sir Intha Kaali (2018)
Pariyerum Perumal (2018)
Thuppakki Munai (2018)
Sandakozhi 2 (2018)
Silukkuvarupatti Singam (2018)
Sathru (2019)
Mehandi Circus (2019)
Mr. Local (2019)
Puppy (2019)
Irandam Ulagaporin Kadaisi Gundu (2019)
 Shylock (2020; Malayalam)
Naan Sirithal (2020)
God Father (2020)
Alti (2020)
Thatrom Thookrom (2020)
Bhoomi (2021)
Pulikkuthi Pandi (2021)
Kuruthi Kalam (2021)
Kalathil Santhippom (2021)
Sangathalaivan (2021)
Sulthan (2021)
Sarbath (2021)
Laabam (2021)
Rudra Thandavam (2021)
Doctor (2021)
IPC 376 (2021)
 Enemy (2021)
 MGR Magan (2021)
 Sivaranjiniyum Innum Sila Pengalum (2021)
 Atrangi Re (2021; Hindi)
 Plan Panni Pannanum (2021)
 Theal (2022)
 Anbarivu (2022)
 Carbon (2022)
 Marutha (2022)
 Veeramae Vaagai Soodum (2022)
 Visithiran (2022)
 Ayngaran (2022)
 Vikram (2022)
 Radha Krishna (2022)
 Yenni Thuniga (2022)
 Aruvaa Sanda (2022)
 Kodai (2023)
 Kannai Nambathey (2023)

Television

References

Living people
Tamil film directors
Indian male film actors
Film directors from Tamil Nadu
Male actors in Tamil cinema
People from Theni district
Male actors from Tamil Nadu
21st-century Indian male actors
1967 births